Toetsho Gewog (Dzongkha: སྟོད་མཚོ་) is a gewog (village block) of Trashiyangtse District, Bhutan.

References

Gewogs of Bhutan
Trashiyangtse District